Filip Krajinović was the defending champion but lost in the quarterfinals to Paolo Lorenzi.

Taro Daniel won the title after defeating Daniel Gimeno-Traver 6–3, 6–4 in the final.

Seeds

Draw

Finals

Top half

Bottom half

References
Main Draw
Qualifying Draw

Internazionali di Tennis del Friuli Venezia Giulia - Singles
Friuli
Internazionali di Tennis del Friuli Venezia Giulia